Lygisaurus novaeguineae is a species of skink found in Queensland in Australia, Indonesia, and Papua New Guinea.

References

Lygisaurus
Reptiles described in 1874
Skinks of Australia
Taxa named by Adolf Bernhard Meyer